Vasanthi may refer to:

 Vasanthi (1988 film), an Indian Tamil-language film
 Vasanthi (2021 film), an Indian Malayalam-language film
 Vasanthi (actress), Indian actress and producer

See also
 Vasanta (disambiguation)